XRDS, formerly Crossroads, is the flagship academic magazine for student members of the Association for Computing Machinery (ACM). Issues focus on  computer science topics and are published quarterly in both print and electronic forms. The magazine is distributed to tens of thousands of students worldwide. The full text of every issue is available online to ACM members through the ACM Digital Library, with many articles selected by the editorial staff open to the general public. The first edition was published in 1994(ACM 2010) and was ACM's first electronically produced publication, originally being distributed in HTML. It is run by a group of volunteer students and supported by staff at ACM headquarters in New York City. XRDS employs a mixed invited and unsolicited submissions model, which are refereed by a staff of permanent editors.(ACM 2010b) Issues exist for every quarter since Fall 1994, with a few extra, mid-Summer, issues.(ACM 2010c)

List of editors-in-chief

List of editors (past and current)

Relaunch
The magazine was originally titled Crossroads, but in May 2010, it was given a makeover led by then editor-in-chief Chris Harrison and the title was replaced by the pseudo-acronym "XRDS". Prior to the relaunch, the format of the magazine was similar to that of its cousin for ACM professional members, the Communications of the ACM, where articles are summaries of research papers. With the Summer 2010 issue of XRDS, ACM inaugurated a completely revamped edition of the magazine. Targeted to both graduate and undergraduate students contemplating computing careers, the newly redesigned XRDS offers breaking news and information, practical career advice, and first-hand stories and profiles of people in the computing field.

References

External links 
 

XRDS
Computer magazines published in the United States
Magazines published in New York City
Quarterly magazines published in the United States
Magazines established in 1994